Scorrier is a village in Cornwall, England, United Kingdom. The Plymouth to Penzance railway line passes through the village and between 1852 and 1964 it had its own station. A. E. Rodda & Son, the principal maker of clotted cream is based here.

History 
The village is in the Gwennap Mining District of the Cornwall and West Devon Mining Landscape World Heritage Site. The name "Scorrier" is first attested as Scoria in 1330. It means "mining waste", deriving from the Latin word scoria.

Tregullow House was a country house that had been passed down through the Williams family, a well-known local family that had made their fortune in the mining of tin and copper. At Tregullow there are two Cornish crosses: one of them formerly stood between Ponsanooth and Pengreep and was for a time used as a gatepost.

Assa Govranckowe 1580, Kyver Ankou circa 1720, is a place on the Penwith – Kerrier boundary near Scorrier. Its toponym is derived from keverango (meaning "hundreds"). Here the four western hundreds of Cornwall meet at one point (Penwith, northwest; Kerrier, southwest; Powder, southeast; Pydar, northeast).

Scorrier House

Scorrier House, just south of the village, was built in 1778 by John Williams the Third of the Williams family, from the fortune he made from tin mining; it was substantially enlarged in 1845.

References

External links

Villages in Cornwall